Sonic and ultrasonic weapons (USW) are weapons of various types that use sound to injure or incapacitate an opponent. Some sonic weapons make a focused beam of sound or of ultrasound; others produce an area field of sound.  military and police forces make some limited use of sonic weapons.

Use and deployment 

Extremely high-power sound waves can disrupt or destroy the eardrums of a target and cause severe pain or disorientation. This is usually sufficient to incapacitate a person. Less powerful sound waves can cause humans to experience nausea or discomfort.

The possibility of a device that produces frequency that causes vibration of the eyeballs—and therefore distortion of vision—was suggested by paranormal researcher Vic Tandy in the 1990s while attempting to demystify a "haunting" in his laboratory in Coventry.  This "spook" was characterised by a feeling of unease and vague glimpses of a grey apparition. Some detective work implicated a newly-installed extractor fan, found by Tandy, that was generating infrasound of 18.9 Hz, 0.3 Hz, and 9 Hz.

A long-range acoustic device (LRAD) produces a 30 degree cone of audible sound in frequencies within the human hearing spectrum (20 Hz – 20 kHz).  An LRAD was used by the crew of the cruise ship Seabourn Spirit in 2005 to deter pirates who chased and attacked the ship.  More commonly this device and others of similar design have been used to disperse protesters and rioters in crowd control efforts.  A similar system is called a "magnetic acoustic device". The Mosquito sonic devices have been used in the United Kingdom to deter teenagers from lingering around shops in target areas. The device works by emitting an ultra-high frequency blast (around 19–20 kHz) that teenagers or people under approximately 20 are susceptible to and find uncomfortable. Age-related hearing loss apparently prevents the ultra-high pitch sound from causing a nuisance to those in their late twenties and above, though this is wholly dependent on a young person's past exposure to high sound pressure levels. In 2020 and 2021, Greek authorities used long-range sound cannons to deter migrants on the Turkish border.

High-amplitude sound of a specific pattern at a frequency close to the sensitivity peak of human hearing (2–3 kHz) is used as a burglar deterrent.

Some police forces have used sound cannons against protesters, for example during the 2009 G20 Pittsburgh summit, the 2014 Ferguson unrest, and the 2016 Dakota Access Pipeline protest in North Dakota, among others.

It has been reported that "sonic attacks" may have taken place in the American embassy in Cuba in 2016 and 2017 ("Havana syndrome"), leading to health problems, including hearing loss, in US and Canadian government employees at the US and Canadian embassies in Havana. However, more recent reports hypothesize microwave energy as the cause.

It has also been reported that China has developed the first hand-held portable sonic gun to target protestors.

Research

Studies have found that exposure to high intensity ultrasound at frequencies from 700 kHz to 3.6 MHz can cause lung and intestinal damage in mice.  Heart rate patterns following vibroacoustic stimulation has resulted in serious negative consequences such as atrial flutter and bradycardia.

See: Microwave auditory effect

Effects other than to the ears
The extra-aural (unrelated to hearing) bioeffects on various internal organs and the central nervous system included auditory shifts, vibrotactile sensitivity change, muscle contraction, cardiovascular function change, central nervous system effects, vestibular (inner ear) effects, and chest wall/lung tissue effects.  Researchers found that low-frequency sonar exposure could result in significant cavitations, hypothermia, and tissue shearing.  No follow up experiments were recommended.  Tests performed on mice show the threshold for both lung and liver damage occurs at about 184 dB.  Damage increases rapidly as intensity is increased.  The American Institute of Ultrasound in Medicine (AIUM) has stated that there have been no proven biological effects associated with an unfocused sound beam with intensities below 100 mW/cm² SPTA or focused sound beams below an intensity level of 1 mW/cm² SPTA.

Noise-induced neurologic disturbances in scuba divers exposed to continuous low-frequency tones for durations longer than 15 minutes has involved in some cases the development of immediate and long-term problems affecting brain tissue. The symptoms resembled those of individuals who had suffered minor head injuries. One theory for a causal mechanism is that the prolonged sound exposure resulted in enough mechanical strain to brain tissue to induce an encephalopathy.  Divers and aquatic mammals may also suffer lung and sinus injuries from high intensity, low-frequency sound. This is due to the ease with which low-frequency sound passes from water into a body, but not into any pockets of gas in the body, which reflect the sound due to mismatched acoustic impedance.

See also 
Brown note
Directional sound
Electronic harassment
The Hum
Infrasound
LED incapacitator
Long-range acoustic device
Parametric array
Sone (a unit of loudness of sound)
Sonic screwdriver
Sound intensity
Sound power
Sound pressure
Ultrasonic welding
Ultrasound

References

Further reading

External links
 ‘’USA Today’’ report on cruise ship attack – Data on device used by cruise ship (PDF)
  Jack Sargeant, with David Sutton. Sonic weapons. ForteanTimes, December 2001
  Daria Vaisman.  "The Acoustics of War."  Cabinet, Winter 2001/2002.
  Gerry Vassilatos.  "The Sonic Doom of Valdimir Gavreau.",  Journal of Borderland Research, October 1996.

Ultrasound
Non-lethal weapons
Devices to alter consciousness
Directed-energy weapons
Emerging technologies